Boppeus is a genus of beetles in the family Cerambycidae, containing the following species:

 Boppeus acuticollis Villiers, 1982
 Boppeus brevicollis Villiers, 1982
 Boppeus fairmairei (Boppe, 1921)
 Boppeus laevis Villiers, 1982
 Boppeus lagrioides Villiers, 1982
 Boppeus orientalis Villiers, 1982
 Boppeus pauliani Villiers, 1982
 Boppeus peyrierasi Vives, 2004
 Boppeus sericeus Villiers, 1982
 Boppeus viettei Villiers, 1982

References

Dorcasominae